MEAI (5-methoxy-2-aminoindane or 5-MeO-AI or Chaperon) belongs to the indane family of molecules. Its molecular structure was first mentioned implicitly in a markush structure schema appearing in a patent from 1998. It was later explicitly and pharmacologically described in a peer reviewed paper in 2017 by David Nutt and Ezekiel Golan et al. followed by another in February 2018 which detailed the pharmacokinetics, pharmacodynamics and metabolism of MEAI by Shimshoni, David Nutt, Ezekiel Golan et al. One year later it was studied and reported on in another peer reviewed paper by Halberstadt et al. The aminoindane family of molecules was, perhaps, first chemically described in 1980.

MEAI was an early candidate of alcohol replacement drugs that came to market during a late 2010s movement to replace alcohol with less-toxic alternatives spearheaded by British psychopharmacologist David Nutt rippling to the rest of Europe. 

In an act of gonzo journalism, Michael Slezak writing for New Scientist, tried and reported on his experience with MEAI after being provided with it by Dr Zee (Ezekiel Golan) after an interview Golan claimed he invented MEAI and originally intended MEAI to be sold as a legal high but instead indicated plans to work with David Nutt and his company DrugScience to develop MEAI further based on Golan's patents as a "binge behaviour regulator" and "alcoholic beverage substitute".

In 2018, a company named Diet Alcohol Corporation of the Americas (DACOA) began openly marketing an MEAI-based drink called "Pace" for sale in the USA and Canada. Pace was described as a 50ml bottle containing 160mg of MEAI in mineral water. Distribution halted after Health Canada released a warning indicating the substance was considered illegal to market for consumption in Canada due to structural similarity to amphetamine. In a December 2018 article by CBC News, Ezekiel Golan (Dr Z/Dr Zee) was interviewed and publicly came out as the "lead scientist" of Pace claiming "tens of thousands" of bottles were already sold in Canada. Golan claimed the MEAI featured in Pace was "manufactured in India" and "bottled in Delaware". Health Canada provided a statement to CBC News stating "Pace is an illegal and unauthorized product in Canada." Both Chemistry World and The BBC have dubbed Ezekiel Golan as "the man who invents legal highs". The Guardian called him "the godfather of legal highs" for his contribution in reintroducing substituted cathinone based drugs commonly sold as Bath salts (drug) including Mephedrone  

On May 26th, 2022 MEAI was prepared for FDA registration by Clearmind Medicine Inc.; Clearmind Medicine claims wide intellectual property holdings to Ezekiel Golan's patents. In March 2022 Clearmind Medicine announced supportive evidence from animal studies in mice attesting to suppression of alcohol consumption. In June 2022 Clearmind Medicine announced promising results from animal studies that showed promise for treating cocaine addiction with MEAI.

See also 
MMAI
5-IAI
MDAI
MDMAI
NM-2-AI
TAI
Pagoclone

References

External links 
Information Video About Alcohol Consumption

Designer drugs
2-Aminoindanes
Phenol ethers